Flindersia acuminata, commonly known as silver silkwood, icewood, Putt's pine, Paddy King's beech or silver maple, is a species of tree that has pinnate leaves with between six and ten egg-shaped to elliptic leaflets, creamy yellow flowers arranged in panicles, and fruit studded with short, rough points.

Description

Taxonomy
Flindersia acuminata was first formally described in 1919 by Cyril Tenison White in the Botany Bulletin of the Queensland Department of Agriculture.

Distribution and habitat

Conservation status
Flindersia acuminata is classified as of "least concern" under the Queensland Government Nature Conservation Act 1992.

References

acuminata
Flora of Queensland
Sapindales of Australia
Trees of Australia
Plants described in 1919
Taxa named by Cyril Tenison White